Walter Rickett (20 March 1917 – 1991) was an English professional footballer who played as a winger for Sheffield United, Blackpool, Sheffield Wednesday, Rotherham United and Halifax Town.

Blackpool
Rickett signed for Joe Smith's Blackpool during the 1947–48 season, making his debut on 14 February 1948, in a 3–1 victory over Grimsby Town at Bloomfield Road. He went on to make a further thirteen league appearances for the club that season, scoring twice (one in 2–1 defeat at Sheffield United and one in a 7–0 victory at Preston North End in the final game of the season). He also played in two FA Cup ties, including Blackpool's 4–2 defeat to Manchester United in the final.

References

External links

List of Rotherham United players

1917 births
1991 deaths
English footballers
Association football wingers
English Football League players
Sheffield United F.C. players
Blackpool F.C. players
Sheffield Wednesday F.C. players
Rotherham United F.C. players
Halifax Town A.F.C. players
Huddersfield Town A.F.C. wartime guest players
Ballymena United F.C. managers
English football managers
Date of death missing
Place of death missing
Sittingbourne F.C. players
Footballers from Sheffield
Dundalk F.C. managers
FA Cup Final players